The Kolesov's Campaign was an unsuccessful attempt to seize power in the Bukhara Emirate by the Russian Bolsheviks and Young Bukharians during the Civil War in Russia (March 1918).

Alignment of political forces in Turkestan
After the Bolsheviks came to power in October 1917, the Council of People's Commissars of the Russian Socialist Federative Soviet Republic recognized the independence of Bukhara and canceled the agreement on the protectorate of Russia. In Tashkent, after an armed uprising, a government was established, consisting of Bolsheviks and Left Socialist Revolutionaries. In Bukhara itself, under the influence of the events taking place in Russia, the confrontation between the government of the emir and the Young Bukharians, a political movement that emerged from Jadidism, is intensifying. Against the background of unsuccessful attempts to persuade the emir to carry out limited reforms, the leaders of the Young Bukharians set a course for preparing an armed uprising and turned their eyes to the revolutionary government in Tashkent.

Preparation of the action
In early December 1917, the Young Bukharians came into contact with the Bolsheviks. A delegation of the Central Committee of the Young Bukharians headed by Fayzulla Khodjaev is sent to Tashkent in order to enlist the support of Tashkent in the upcoming armed uprising. During the uprising, according to the plans of the Young Bukharians, a revolutionary government was to be formed, and the emir was assigned only a decorative function. The government of Turkestan was required to help the Young Bukharians with weapons, and, if necessary, with troops.

During the negotiations of Fayzulla Khodjaev with the chairman of the Council of People's Commissars of Soviet Turkestan Fyodor Kolesov, the latter approved the plans of the Young Bukharians and promised support, advising to postpone the uprising until the end of the liquidation of the Kokand Autonomy.

New Bukhara (Kagan) became the center of preparation for the uprising. After the successful suppression of the Kokand Autonomy and success with the performance of demobilized Cossack units in Samarkand, Kolesov appears in New Bukhara in early March and informs the Young Bukharians that the performance should take place in five days, and once again promised to bring weapons, ammunition and troops. This news was unexpected for the Young Bukharians. Plans to organize a large–scale uprising, for which there was no weapon, no time, have to be abandoned. The Central Committee of the Young Bukharians forms a revolutionary committee in New Bukhara headed by Fayzulla Khodjaev and arms a detachment of its supporters in the amount of 200 people.

Chronology of events
The Turkestan government, consisting of Bolsheviks and Socialist Revolutionaries, embarked on a course to support the Young Bukharians and to overthrow the emir. Meanwhile, the Turkestan government did not expect serious resistance from the emir, hoping for the all–round support of the revolutionary forces inside Bukhara.

In early March, units of the Red Guard under the command of the Chairman of the Council of People's Commissars Fyodor Kolesov were concentrated in Kagan. In total, the campaign was attended by: Samarkand, Kushkin, Trans–Caspian, Tashkent, Chardzhu and Kagan detachments, sailors of the Amu Darya flotilla, a detachment of Young Bukharians. The Chief of Staff was the commander of the Amu Darya flotilla, 1st Rank Captain Kishishev.

An ultimatum was presented to the Emir of Bukhara demanding that he relinquish power. The text of the ultimatum required: "To dissolve the government existing under you and to appoint in its place the Executive Committee of the Young Bukharians". The emir's government initially agreed to accept the ultimatum. Alim Khan pretended to concede and sent the text of the new manifesto: "Providing all our people with freedom of speech, freedom of trade, freedom of society... we establish an Executive Committee within the Bukhara liberals and carry out all reforms according to the program and instructions of this Committee...". During the negotiations with Kolesov, the following terms of surrender were discussed. Representatives of the Turkestan government leave for Old Bukhara and disarm the emir's troops. They will be accompanied by a convoy of 25 Red Army cavalrymen. The next day, under the protection of a detachment of five hundred people, the Bukhara Revolutionary Committee arrives in the capital and declares itself to be the government. The rest of the units depart for the Kagan station. At the same time, the emir leaves Old Bukhara, who is guaranteed unhindered passage outside the khanate, wherever he wishes.

But a detachment of parliamentarians, which entered Bukhara together with a convoy of 25 people, accompanied by the highest Bukhara dignitaries, was unexpectedly attacked and almost completely destroyed. From the memoirs of a participant in the events:

Kolesov resumes hostilities, but the emir mobilizes all residents of Bukhara to repulse the Bolsheviks. As a participant in the events recalled, "Yesterday only Alimkhan's army and several hundred religious fanatics were against us. Now thousands of Bukharians have joined it". Bukhara troops attacked military units in Kagan. The situation of the Bolsheviks near Bukhara was complicated by the fact that the Bukhara government destroyed the railway tracks in a timely manner, which is why at the most crucial moment the Merv detachment, stopped in Karakul, did not come to the place of the battle, and the expected echelon with ammunition from Tashkent (stuck at the station Kermine).

Realizing the futility of further struggle, Kolesov decides to retreat in the direction of Samarkand – Tashkent, evacuating the population of Kagan (mainly Europeans) together with the troops. As a participant in the campaign recalls: "The carriages were packed with women, old people and children. They carried home belongings with them. All those who were threatened with certain death were going to leave with us". The retreat took several days along a partially destroyed railway. The trains were constantly attacked by Bukhara troops. One of the main problems is the lack of water in the unit. As a participant in the hike recalls: "Water supplies were quickly depleted. A severe drinking regime was established. Reinforced guards were posted near the vats. Here almost always women crowded in the vain hope to beg for an additional portion of moisture for the children...". The Kolesov's echelons were rescued by a detachment expelled from Tashkent, led by the Left Socialist Revolutionaries Koluzaev, Petrenko and Stepanov.

In addition to attempts to destroy the echelons that left the Kagan, the Bukhara army carried out a number of raids across the territory of the Turkestan Republic with the aim of destroying villages and European residents along the railway junctions.

The peace treaty with the Bukhara government was signed on March 25, 1918 at the Kizyl–Tepe station. Alimkhan pledged to compensate for the losses caused to Soviet Turkestan and to limit his armed forces to 12 thousand people. A permanent Soviet representative was appointed to Old Bukhara. The population evacuated from the Kagan was returning back.

Meanwhile, in Bukhara itself, a massacre was staged, in which up to one and a half thousand supporters of the Young Bukharians died. About 8,000 people, including the overwhelming part of the Young Bukharians, emigrated from Bukhara. Among the emigrants was the writer Sadriddin Aini. Defeat, brutal reprisals, the threat of destruction and emigration to a large extent brought the Young Bukharians closer to the Bolsheviks, some of them became members of the newly created Bukhara Communist Party. In 1918–1919, Fayzulla Khodjaev worked in the People's Commissariat for Foreign Affairs of the Russian Socialist Federative Soviet Republic and organized a branch of the Young Bukharian Party in Moscow, and upon his arrival in Tashkent in 1920, the Central Bureau of the Young Bukharian Revolutionary Party.

See also
Bukhara Operation (1920)
Revolution in Bukhara
Bukhara Khanate
Bukhara People's Soviet Republic

References

External links
Ivan Kuts. Years in the Saddle // Moscow: "Military Publishing House of the Ministry of Defense of the Soviet Union", 1964 – 152 Pages. (Military Memoirs) / Literary Edition by O. M. Ivanov
Faizulla Khojaev. On the History of the Revolution in Bukhara and the National Demarcation of Central Asia // Selected Works in Three Volumes. (Editorial board A. A. Agzamkhodzhaev and Others). Volume I – Tashkent: "Fan", 1970
Seymour Becker. Russia's Protectorates in Central Asia Bukhara and Khiva, 1865—1924. London — New York: Routledge Curzon. 2004. Pages 207–210
Kolesov's Campaign to Bukhara (1918)

Battles of the Russian Civil War
Wars of independence